Five on a Secret Trail is the fifteenth novel in the Famous Five series by Enid Blyton. It was first published in 1956.

Plot
George decides to go camping with her dog, Timmy, so he can recover from an ear injury without being mocked for wearing a large cardboard collar that prevents him from scratching his wound. George is pleased to be joined at the campsite by her cousin Anne, but is disappointed upon learning that Anne's brothers, Julian and Dick, are in France and thus, would not be able to visit them.

George and Anne encounter a boy named Guy, the son of a famous archaeologist named Sir John Lawdler, and his small, one-eyed mongrel dog called Jet. The boy is excavating an old Roman camp to search for artefacts and asks the girls not to disturb him. Later that day, the boy's twin brother named Harry (which is later revealed) comes to the area, but the girls mistake him for the first boy, unaware they are dealing with twins. This made the girls confused, as the first boy who was at a different place, and would double-up and reach another place, where the girls are at (This makes a huge confusion as they think that he is just one crazy, mad boy, who likes to say things and make promises and later to say that he didn't make such promises or so).Later that night, Anne gets up for a drink from the nearby stream and while trying to return to the camp, she ends up near a derelict, ruined cottage, where she sees lights and hears whispers and footsteps. She gets scared and then takes George and Timmy to the cottage but there is no indication of any human activity.

The next day, the girls again encounter the twins separately. The girls then go to George's parents' house for more food supplies and are informed that Julian and Dick will be arriving in a day or two. The following night, a storm prompts the girls to shelter in the old cottage, where they are shocked to see people outside during the heavy storm and rain. The girls get scared, and Anne decides to leave the place the next day as she did not want to stay at the old cottage anymore.

Julian and Dick arrive the next day and notices the Anne and George are about to leave, the girls say about their reason for leaving the camp. Later, the four children decide to stay in the ruined cottage to see what would happen. That night, while sleeping in the old cottage they hear weeping and wailing noises and see some kind of light that makes them a bit afraid. The next morning, the four understands that someone was trying to get rid of them from the old cottage.

Julian and Dick decide to visit the old cottage that night, to find if there were any suspicious activity going on. They find that a gang of people are trying to find a secret tunnel in which a very precious blueprint was kept. The boys then declare their findings to the girls. Later George finds a clue to the secret tunnel and they go through a long and tiring tunnel and subsequently discovers a leather bag, that felt very light. Later, the five with Guy, Harry and Jet go to Kirrin Cottage. Later, a police officer arrives and opens the bag but finds nothing. Later, the police tear the lining of the bag and find a blueprint. Afterwards, Uncle Quentin reveals that it was a secret document which has only two copies in the world, one with himself and the other with Sir James Lawton-Harrison (which has been stolen).

Later, the five were supposed to get a reward although, very secretly. At last, it was shown that Timmy was scratching the wound on his ear making it go bad again, and he would have to wear the cardboard collar again, just as the story began with.

External links
 
Five On A Secret Trail at www.enidblyton.net
Enid Blyton Society page

1956 British novels
Hodder & Stoughton books
Famous Five novels
1956 children's books